The 2018 District of Columbia Attorney General election was held on November 6, 2018, to elect the Attorney General of Washington, D.C. This was the second ever Attorney General election in D.C. history. 

Incumbent Attorney General Democrat Karl Racine handily won re-election.

Results

References

Attorney General
Attorney General 2018
District of Columbia